Lamine Ndao (born 19 December 1994) is a Senegalese professional footballer who plays as a forward.

Career
Following lack of playing time at Valenciennes, Ndao was linked with Ligue 2 sides Auxerre and Orléans in early January 2018. Later that month, however, Ndao joined Quevilly-Rouen on a contract until the end of the season, with the option of an extension.

In January 2019, after half a season in Belgium with Waasland-Beveren, Ndao signed a two-and-a-half year contract with Gazélec Ajaccio in Ligue 2.

Dao re-signed for Quevilly-Rouen in August 2019. In August 2020 he moved to Concarneau.

Honours 
Le Puy

 Championnat National 2: 2021–22

References

1994 births
Living people
Association football forwards
Senegalese footballers
Senegalese expatriate footballers
Ligue 2 players
Belgian Pro League players
Championnat National players
Championnat National 2 players
Valenciennes FC players
US Quevilly-Rouen Métropole players
S.K. Beveren players
Gazélec Ajaccio players
US Concarneau players
Le Puy Foot 43 Auvergne players
Expatriate footballers in France
Expatriate footballers in Belgium